Perquackey is a word game played with dice, produced by Cardinal Industries, Inc. of Long Island City, New York. It was previously produced by Lakeside Toys, a division of Lakeside Industries, Inc. of Minneapolis, Minnesota, and originally by The Shreve Company of Los Angeles, California. It is similar to the 1956 game Spill & Spell.

Gameplay
The game is played with 10 black-lettered dice and three red-lettered dice.

Each player, initially, rolls the 10 black-lettered dice. The player must rearrange them into as many words as possible within a certain time, reusing the letters repeatedly. Points are scored according to the length of each word and the number of words made. Once a player reaches 2,500 points, all 13 dice are used; all words must now contain at least four letters. A player with at least 2,500 points is considered "vulnerable"; at least 500 points must be scored in a turn, or 500 points are deducted from their score.

The first player to reach 5,000 points is the winner.

Distribution
The dice are labeled as follows:

Black dice:
A,A,A,E,E,E (2)
B,H,I,K,R,T
F,H,I,R,S,U
G,I,M,R,S,U
E,J,Q,V,X,Z
F,I,N,P,T,U
C,M,O,O,P,W
D,L,N,O,R,T
B,L,O,O,W,Y
Red dice (classic):
Q,S,S,V,W,Y
B,F,H,L,N,P
C,D,G,J,K,M
Red dice (post-2004?):
B,F,P,Q,S,Y
C,D,G,J,K,M
H,L,N,S,V,W

In popular culture 

In the Dick Van Dyke Show episode "A Man's Teeth Are Not His Own," Rob and Laura play a game of Perquackey with their neighbors.

In a Season 5 episode of Maude, Maude tells her Aunt Lola that their fun evening is to include a game of Perquackey with friends Arthur and Vivian.

In the song "S&M" by Dean Friedman, one of the choruses reads: "Oo, Oo, Aha. Do it again, pretty momma. We'll buy ice-cream. I'll let you treat me. We'll play Perquackey. I'll let you beat me."

In the Three's Company episode "Critic's Choice," Mr. Furley bursts in to invite Janet and Terri to play a game of Perquackey.

In the Blossom episode “I Ain’t Got No Buddy,” Blossom’s dad Nick threatens Blossom, Anthony, and Joey with a game of Perquackey if they don’t tell him what they’re hiding.

In the Night Court episode "Looking for Mr. Shannon," Judge Harold T. Stone rues Bull's failed bachelor party by claiming, "We could have been at my place playing Perquackey."

In the episode "Ren's Pecs" of The Ren & Stimpy Show, the beach bully kicks cat litter in Ren's face and leaves with two beach babes, saying, "Come on, dolls. Let's go play Perquackey."

In a Season 5 episode of Sabrina the Teenage Witch, Sabrina's roommate Roxie promises to be nice to their other roommate Miles, "as long as dork boy doesn't make me play Perquackey".

See also 
Boggle
Scrabble

References

External links 
 Cardinal Industries Perquackey Page
 BoardGameGeek.com Perquackey page
 How to Play Perquackey
 online word generating program, for use with the game

Word games
Dice games
Word board games
Tabletop games
Multiplayer games
Products introduced in 1956